Sean Robert Polley (born 27 April 1981) is an English cricketer. Polley is a right-handed batsman who bowls right-arm medium-fast. He was born in Basra, Iraq.

While studying for his degree at Durham University, Polley made his first-class debut for Durham UCCE against Nottinghamshire in 2003. He made two further first-class appearance in 2003, against Durham and Lancashire. In his three first-class matches, he scored 105 runs at an average of 21.00, with a high score of 41. With the ball, he took just a single wicket which came at an overall cost of 160 runs.

References

External links
Sean Polley at ESPNcricinfo
Sean Polley at CricketArchive

1981 births
Living people
People from Basra
Sportspeople from Basra
Alumni of Durham University
English cricketers
Durham MCCU cricketers